Marmaray is a  long intercontinental commuter rail line located in Istanbul, Turkey. The line runs from Halkalı, on the European side, to Gebze, on the Asian side, along the north shore of the Sea of Marmara. Mostly using the right-of-way of two existing commuter rail lines, the Marmaray line linked the two lines via a tunnel under the Bosporus strait, becoming the first standard gauge rail connection between Europe and Asia. The two existing sections of the line were rebuilt and expanded from two-tracks to three-tracks, to allow for higher capacity with intercity and freight rail. The name Marmaray is a portmanteau of the words Marmara and Ray, which is Turkish for rail.

History 
Construction started in 2004 and was originally intended to be completed by April 2009. After multiple delays caused – among other things – by the discovery of historical and archaeological sites along the route as new stations were built, the first phase of the project was finally opened by prime minister Erdoğan on October 29, 2013. The second phase of the project was scheduled to open in 2015 but work once again stopped in 2014. It was restarted in February 2017 and the line finally opened in its entirety on March 12, 2019. The trains came with completely new rolling stock, with carriages that can be walked through from end to end.

The line can carry 75,000 passengers per hour in each direction (PPHPD). Travel time from Halkali to Gebze normally takes 104 minutes.

The Marmaray is integrated with other parts of the Istanbul public transport network, including the Metro and the Metrobus network, via a number of interchanges. It is also integrated with the YHT high-speed train network to Ankara, Eskişehir and Konya, as well as with the international trains to Sofia in Bulgaria which depart from Halkalı.

==Project==

First phase 
The contract for the project was awarded to a Japanese-Turkish consortium led by Taisei Corporation in July 2004. The consortium included Gama Endustri Tesisleri Imalat ve Montaj and Nurol Construction.

Each section weigh up to 18,000 tons. It is accessed via tunnels bored from Kazlıçeşme on the European side and Ayrılıkçeşmesi on the Asian side of Istanbul and represents the world's deepest undersea immersed tube tunnel. Fire-resistant concrete developed in Norway was essential for the safety of the project.

Construction started in May 2004 and the Marmaray tunnel was completed on September 23, 2008, with a formal ceremony to mark its completion on October 13.

Second phase 
The second phase of the project involved the renewal of the old suburban railway that ran between Halkalı and Kazlıçeşme on the European side of Istanbul and between Ayrılıkçeşmesi and Gebze on the Asian side. The work was meant to be completed at the same time as the first phase ( the tunnel and underground sections), but was delayed until March, 2019.

A third line was added to enable the electric multiple unit (EMU) cars and other railway carriages to move separately. Thirty-six above-ground stations along the line were rebuilt or completely refurbished. Signalling was also modernised to allow trains to travel as close as two minutes apart (although in reality far fewer trains than that actually run).

The suburban-rail upgrade part of the project, known originally as CR1, was first awarded to the AMD Rail Consortium, comprising Marubeni of Japan, Dogus Insaat of Turkey and Alstom of France. However, they were unable to complete the work and it was re-tendered as contract CR3 in early 2011. The replacement contract worth €932.8 million was awarded to a joint venture between OHL and Invensys Rail.

Freight 
In February 2010, Railway Gazette International reported that the tunnel's administrators were hiring consultants to analyse options for carrying freight traffic. The Prime Minister and other officials have suggested that the Marmaray will help to create a modern "Iron Silk Road" by allowing freight trains to travel between Europe and China. Freight trains not carrying dangerous goods will be able to use the tunnel when commuter services are not operating (between 1:00 a.m. and 5:00 a.m.).

Financing 
The Japan International Cooperation Agency (JICA) and the European Investment Bank (EBI) provided much of the financing for the project. By April 2006, the JICA had lent 111 billion yen and the EIB 1.05 billion euro for the work. The original cost was estimated at $4.5 billion  although it finally cost almost twice that.

Rolling stock 

The Marmaray uses TCDD E32000 rolling stock manufactured by Hyundai Rotem in ten- and five-car EMU configurations. The original  contract called for 440 vehicles to be produced locally by Eurotem, Hyundai Rotem's joint venture with Turkish rolling stock manufacturer TÜVASAŞ. Hyundai Rotem was chosen ahead of Alstom, CAF, and a consortium of Bombardier, Siemens, and Nurol.

There are two depot and maintenance yards on the line (one at each end) where the sets are stocked.

Archaeological discoveries during work on the Marmaray 
The project was delayed by four years, largely due to the discovery of Byzantine-era and other 8,000-year-old archaeological finds on the proposed site of the European tunnel terminal at Yenikapı in 2005. Excavations then produced evidence of the city's largest harbour, the 4th-century Harbour of Eleutherios (later known as the Harbour of Theodosius). Archaeologists also uncovered traces of the city wall of Constantine the Great, and the remains of several ships, including what appears to be the only ancient or early medieval galley ever discovered, preventing the project from proceeding as planned. In addition, archaeologists uncovered the oldest evidence of settlement in Istanbul, with artefacts, including amphorae, pottery fragments, shells, pieces of bone and horse skulls, and nine human skulls found in a bag, dating back to 6,000 BCE. Glass artefacts and fragments dating from the Hellenistic, Roman, Byzantine and Ottoman periods were also found during excavations at Sirkeci.

Opening 
On August 4, 2013, Prime Minister Recep Tayyip Erdoğan, test-drove the Marmaray from Ayrılıkçeşmesi station (originally İbrahimağa station) on the Asian side under the Bosphorus and back again.

On October 29, 2013, the first stage of the Marmaray project, the underground tunnel between Europe and Asia, was inaugurated on the 90th anniversary of the Turkish Republic'. The maiden journey took place after a grand opening ceremony attended by President Abdullah Gül and Prime Minister Erdoğan, as well as by the Japanese Prime Minister Shinzō Abe, the Romanian Prime Minister Victor Ponta, the Somali President Hassan Sheikh Mohamud, and a number of foreign civil servants.

On November 7, 2019, the first Chinese freight train to Europe ran through the tunnel. This demonstrated that the China to Turkey transportation time could be reduced from a month to 12 days as part of the Iron Silk Road concept.

Earthquake protection 
"Since AD 342, it has seen large earthquakes that each claimed more than 10,000 lives." Some scientists have estimated a 77% probability that, at some time in the next 30 years, Istanbul will suffer an earthquake measuring 7.0 or more on the Richter magnitude scale. The walls of the tunnel are made of waterproof concrete coated with a steel shell, each section independently watertight. The tunnel is made to flex and bend in the way that tall buildings are constructed to react if an earthquake hits. Floodgates at the joints of the tunnel are able to close and isolate water in the event of the walls' failing.

Steen Lykke, project manager for Avrasyaconsult, the international consortium that oversaw the construction, summed the problems up by saying, "I can't think of any challenge this project lacks".

Marmaray in numbers 
Some figures of the project are as follows:
 Overall length: 
 Tunnel section: 
 Immersed tube: 
 Deepest point: 
 Minimum curve radius: 
 Maximum gradient: 1.8%
 Surface stations: 37
 Underground stations: 3
 Interchanges: 4
 Inter-city stations: 8
 Minimum platform length: 
 Average station spacing: 
 Maximum speed: 
 Commercial speed: 
 Headway: 2–10 minutes
 Passengers per hour and direction: 75,000
 Number of passenger cars: 440

Passengers 
When the Marmaray finally opened, 4.5 million passengers traveled through the tunnel in the first 15 days when travel was free of charge. There were 10 million passengers in the beginning of 2014, 13.5 million in first four months and 21.4 million in first six months.

The Marmaray is expected to carry 1.5 million passengers per day.

See also 
 Eurasia Tunnel
 Great Istanbul Tunnel, a proposed three-level road-rail undersea tunnel
 Public transport in Istanbul
 Rail transport in Turkey
 Turkish Straits

References

External links 

 
 Overview of the Marmary history, justification, and construction process with pictures
 Marmaray Project:
 L. C. F. Ingerslev, 2005, "Considerations and strategies behind the design and construction requirements of the Istanbul Strait immersed tunnel," Tunnelling and Underground Space Technology 20: 604–08.
 Steen Lykke and Hüseyin Belkaya, 2005, "The project and its management," Tunnelling and Underground Space Technology 20: 600–03.
 Steen Lykke and Frits van de Kerk, 2005, "Marine operations, the Bosphorus Crossing," Tunnelling and Underground Space Technology 20: 609–11.
 Hideki Sakaeda, 2005, "Tunnels and stations in BC contract," Tunnelling and Underground Space Technology 20: 612–16.
 
 Istanbul Technical University Marmaray Laboratory web site.
 Tunnelbuilder technical description.
  Marmaray BC1 project and surveying works
 BBC article on the project.

 
2013 establishments in Turkey
Fatih
Underground commuter rail
Üsküdar
Binali Yıldırım
Rail transport in Istanbul
Turkish State Railways
Railway lines opened in 2013
Railway lines opened in 2019
Buildings and structures in Istanbul
Buildings and structures in Kocaeli Province
Transport in Kocaeli Province